A Heart Full of Music (German: Ein Herz voll Musik) is a 1955 West German musical romantic comedy film directed by Robert A. Stemmle and starring Vico Torriani, Ina Halley and Ruth Stephan. It was shot in Eastmancolor at the Bavaria Studios in Munich and on location in Rome and St. Moritz. The film's sets were designed by the art directors Hertha Hareiter and Otto Pischinger.

Cast
 Vico Torriani as Vico Hasenpfot
 Ina Halley as 	Blanche Lichtli
 Ruth Stephan as	Fleurette
 Wolfgang Wahl as 	Peer Saldo
 Fita Benkhoff as Ellinor Patton
 Boy Gobert as Granito Bubiblanca
 Annemarie Sauerweinas 	Liliane Hasenpfot
 Paul Bildt as 	Lichtli
 Rudolf Vogel as Geschäftsführer Léaux
 Mantovani as himself

References

Bibliography
 MacKenzie, Colin. Mantovani: A Lifetime in Music. Melrose Press, 2005.
 Silberman, Marc & Wrage, Henning . DEFA at the Crossroads of East German and International Film Culture: A Companion. Walter de Gruyter, 2014.

External links 
 

1955 films
1955 comedy films
1950s musical comedy films
West German films
1955 musical films
German musical comedy films
1950s German-language films
Films directed by Robert A. Stemmle
1950s German films
Films shot in Rome
Films shot in Switzerland
Films shot at Bavaria Studios

de:Ein Herz voll Musik